Truncatellina cylindrica is a species of very small air-breathing land snail, a terrestrial pulmonate gastropod mollusk in the family Truncatellinidae.

Description
The length of the shell attains 1 mm.

Distribution 
This species occurs in European countries and islands including:
 Czech Republic
 Ukraine
 Great Britain (edge of distribution range)
 Ireland
 France, Greece, Turkey, Albania, Bulgaria, Cyprus

References

Truncatellinidae
Gastropods described in 1807